Trigun is an anime television series based on the manga of the same name written and illustrated by Yasuhiro Nightow. The series follows Vash the Stampede, the most feared outlaw on the planet, who has a $$60 billion ("double dollar") price on his head. He displays a kindhearted, goofy demeanor and goes out of his way not to hurt anyone if he can help it. Most of the destruction blamed on him is actually caused by the extreme measures people take to capture or kill him for the reward; as a result, he has been nicknamed "The Humanoid Typhoon." As he travels through the planet to meet a certain man, he also meets two women, Meryl Stryfe and Milly Thompson, tasked with investigating his actions and minimizing the damage associated with them.

The anime was directed by Satoshi Nishimura at Madhouse, with Yōsuke Kuroda handling series composition, Takahiro Yoshimatsu providing character designs, and music composed by Tsuneo Imahori. The series was originally broadcast on TV Tokyo from April 1 to September 30, 1998. It is licensed for DVD and Blu-ray in the United States by Funimation Entertainment, who re-released it on DVD on October 27, 2010. The opening theme is "H.T." written and arranged by Tsuneo Imahori while the ending is  written, composed, arranged, and sung by Akima & Neos. Trigun was released on VHS and Laserdisc, and later DVD, by JVC and marketed by Victor Entertainment in Japan.

The English version was initially released on VHS and DVD by Pioneer Entertainment (U.S.) L.P. - and when the company became Geneon, re-released as a new box-set. In the mid-2000s, Geneon re-released Trigun on DVD in a REMIX edition featuring the video, digitally remastered for optimal video quality and the sound, also remastered and remixed in 5.1 Dolby Digital AC-3 surround sound. Funimation re-released the series on DVD in late 2010 upon Geneon's collapse. In the United Kingdom, the anime was released on DVD by MVM Films started in 2005, should be finished by end of 2006 (there were delays due to a fire at a disc duplication plant in August 2005) Also, a single UMD, for PlayStation Portable, was released, named Vol. 1, and contained the first two episodes. Trigun is released on DVD in Australia and New Zealand by Madman Entertainment.

Episode list

Home media
Original release
Trigun - The $$60,000,000,000 Man (DVD 1; episodes 1–4) 2000-03-28
Trigun - The $$60,000,000,000 Man [Geneon Signature Series] (DVD 1) 2004-01-06
Trigun - The $$60,000,000,000 Man [Essential Anime] (DVD 1) 2004-12-28
Trigun - Lost Past (DVD 2; episodes 5–7) 2000-05-23
Trigun - Lost Past [Geneon Signature Series] (DVD 2) 2004-03-09
Trigun - Lost Past [Essential Anime] (DVD 2) 2004-12-28
Trigun - Wolfwood (DVD 3; episodes 8–10) 2000-07-25
Trigun - Wolfwood [Geneon Signature Series] (DVD 3) 2004-04-13
Trigun - Gung-Ho Guns (DVD 4; episodes 11–13) 2000-09-26
Trigun - Gung-Ho Guns [Geneon Signature Series] (DVD 4) 2004-05-11
Trigun - Angel Arms (DVD 5; episodes 14–16) 2000-11-21
Trigun - Angel Arms [Geneon Signature Series] (DVD 5) 2004-06-08
Trigun - Project Seeds (DVD 6; episodes 17–19) 2001-01-23
Trigun - Project Seeds [Geneon Signature Series] (DVD 6) 2004-07-13
Trigun - Puppet Master (DVD 7; episodes 20–22) 2001-03-27
Trigun - Puppet Master [Geneon Signature Series] (DVD 7) 2004-08-10
Trigun - High Noon (DVD 8; episodes 23–26) 2001-05-29
Trigun - High Noon [Geneon Signature Series] (DVD 8) 2004-09-14
Collections
Trigun - The Complete Series (DVD 1–4) 2010-10-26
Trigun - The Complete Series [Anime Classics] (DVD 1–4) 2013-03-12
Trigun - Limited Collector's Edition I (DVD 1–3) 2005-11-22
Trigun - Limited Collector's Edition II (DVD 4–6) 2006-01-17
Trigun - The Complete Box Set (DVD 1–8) 2001-11-20
Remix
DVD 1 2006-08-01
DVD 2 2006-09-05
DVD 3 2006-10-03
DVD 4 2006-11-07
DVD 5 2006-12-05
DVD 6 2007-01-02

References

General:
Shōnen Gahōsha episode list 
TV anime resource center page on Trigun
Specific:

Trigun
Trigun